Mampazhakkary is a village in the Kuttanad region of Alappuzha District in South India. It is located near the Pampa River. This village is about 7 km from Changanacherry and 15 km from Alappuzha connected by AC road.

Agriculture is the major occupation of people in this village. The most commonly grown crop is rice. The backwaters of the area are abundant with fish. There is a primary school, Father Philipose Memorial LP School. There is a hospital, Laxmi Nursing Home (known as Dr. Naveenan's hospital). This village has paddy fields and coconut farms. Almost 98% of people are well educated and around 45% working abroad (majority in the Middle East and Western countries). Agricultural is the major source of income. There is a church name Lourd Natha church and there is a publication name is Vayal from Vayal cultural forum.kuttandu RTO and kuttandu vikasana samithy (kVS) is situated in mampuzhakkary.

References

Villages in Alappuzha district